Mahammad Ramazan Abdullayev (born 6 April 1999) is an Azerbaijani boxer. 

He competed in the 2020 Summer Olympics at super heavyweight but lost to eventual winner Bakhodir Jalolov in the second round. He then contested the men's super heavyweight division at the 2021 World Championships, where he won a medal.

References

External links 
 

1999 births
Living people
Sportspeople from Baku
Azerbaijani male boxers
Olympic boxers of Azerbaijan
Boxers at the 2020 Summer Olympics
AIBA World Boxing Championships medalists
Super-heavyweight boxers